The office of Surveyor of the King's/Queen's Works of Art in the Royal Collection Department of the Royal Household of the Sovereign of the United Kingdom is responsible for the care and maintenance of the royal collection of works of art owned by the Sovereign in an official capacity, about 700,000 objects - many of museum quality. The collection is spread across the various official and historic residences. Those objects in the official residences are in constant use. Objects in the Royal Collection are distinct from those objects owned privately and displayed at Sandringham House and Balmoral Castle and elsewhere. The Surveyor oversaw conservation of works of art: there are three conservation workshops, including a recently constructed workshop in the Home Park, Windsor.

The office dates from 1928, and has only been full-time since 1972. Sir Lionel Cust, Surveyor of the King's Pictures, had been responsible for works of art from 1901 to 1927. The last Surveyor, Rufus Bird, was appointed upon the retirement of Jonathan Marsden, CVO, who was in turn appointed upon the retirement of Sir Hugh Roberts on 20 April 2010. Jonathan Marsden was the last Surveyor who was also concurrently Director of the Royal Collection for which he chaired a management committee of the Surveyors and Librarian and other administrators.

The post of Surveyor of the Queen's Works of Art is currently in abeyance. The Department is currently managed by the Deputy Surveyor of the King's Works of Arts.

List of Surveyors of the King's/Queen's Works of Art
Caroline de Guitaut  (Deputy Surveyor) 2020–
Rufus Bird  2017–2020
Sir Jonathan Marsden  2010–2017
Sir Hugh Roberts  1996–2010
Sir Geoffrey de Bellaigue  1972–1996
Sir Francis J.B. Watson  1963–1972
Sir James Mann  1946–1962
Lieutenant-Colonel Lord Gerald Wellesley 1936–1943
Sir Cecil Harcourt-Smith  1928–1936
Sir Lionel Cust 1901–1927 (also Pictures)

References

External links